The Benjamin Franklin National Memorial, located in the rotunda of Franklin Institute science museum in Philadelphia, Pennsylvania, U.S., features a colossal statue of a seated Benjamin Franklin, American writer, inventor, statesman, and Founding Father. The -tall memorial, was sculpted by James Earle Fraser between 1906 and 1911 and dedicated in 1938. With a weight of  the statue rests on a  pedestal of white Seravezza marble. It is the focal piece of the Memorial Hall of the Franklin Institute, which was designed by John Windrim and modeled after the Roman Pantheon. The statue and Memorial Hall were designated as the Benjamin Franklin National Memorial in 1972. It is the primary location memorializing Benjamin Franklin in the U.S.

History
Congress designated the national memorial on October 25, 1972.  Unlike most national memorials, the statue is not listed on the National Register of Historic Places.  The national memorial is an affiliated area of the National Park Service, assigned to Independence National Historical Park through a Memorandum of Agreement entered into on November 6, 1973.  Under terms of the agreement, the Institute owns and maintains the publicly accessible memorial, and the Park Service includes the memorial in official publications and otherwise cooperates with the Institute in all appropriate and mutually agreeable ways on behalf of the memorial.

Public Law 109-153 (December 30, 2005) authorizes the Secretary of the Interior to make available to the Institute up to $10,000,000 in matching grants for the rehabilitation of the memorial and for the development of related exhibits.  This appropriation commemorates the 300th anniversary of Franklin's birth on January 17, 1706.

In 2008, the Memorial underwent a $3.8 million restoration, which included installation of a multi-media presentation about Philadelphia's most famous citizen, now featured in the 3½-minute show "Benjamin Franklin Forever". The memorial's new digital projection, theatrical lighting, and audio effects are fully utilized in a program that introduces Franklin as a curious tinkerer, and demonstrates his profound impact on the world as a premiere international citizen, statesman, civic leader, and scientist. The refurbishment also included improved acoustics, state-of-the-art LED lighting upgrades, and restoration and re-gilding of the oculus to its original brilliance. Throughout the day, quotes from Franklin are projected onto the walls, and graphic panels highlighting his life and accomplishments provide visitors with a still greater appreciation of this Founding Father.

Admission to the National Memorial is free.

The memorial appears in the 2004 film National Treasure.

See also

Franklin Court
Benjamin Franklin House, in London, England, the only surviving home of Benjamin Franklin, now a museum.
Jefferson Memorial
George Mason Memorial
Washington Monument
Memorial to the 56 Signers of the Declaration of Independence
List of national memorials of the United States

References

External links
 National Park Service images of Benjamin Franklin National Memorial (archived 13 February 2006)
 Statement by NPS Dept. Director Durand concerning financial assistance for the Ben. Franklin Nat'l Memorial (archived 13 May 2006)
 James Earle Fraser biography

1911 sculptures
1972 establishments in Pennsylvania
Franklin Institute
Greek Revival architecture in Pennsylvania
History of Philadelphia
Independence National Historical Park
Marble sculptures in Pennsylvania
Monuments and memorials in Philadelphia
National Memorials of the United States
National Register of Historic Places in Philadelphia
Protected areas established in 1972
Protected areas of Philadelphia
 
Works by James Earle Fraser (sculptor)
Colossal statues in the United States